Sophie "Soffy" Christine Elisabeth Walleen née Rosenberg (1861–1940) was a Danish actress who made her début at the Royal Danish Theatre in 1882 as Antoinette in Édouard Pailleron's Gnisten (L'Étincelle). Gaining popularity thanks to her southern look with sparkling brown eyes and dark hair, she went on to perform in Copenhagen's independent theatres, including Folketeatret, Dagmarteatret and the Kasino before returning to the Royal in 1894. She later became a stage director and a talented instructor. In 1910, Soffy Walleen performed in Norsk Film's short silent film Magdelene.

Biography

Born in Spjellerup Parish near Karise on 15 May 1861, Sophie Christine Elisabeth Rosenberg was the daughter of the literature historian Carl Frederik Vilhelm Mathildus Rosenberg (1829–1885) and his wife Ane Lovise née Plum (1833–1874). In June 1894, she married the actor and theatre director Karl Mantzius (1860–1921). They had one child together, Else Louise (1897). The marriage was dissolved in 1902. That year she married the Swedish writer Carl Alphonse Walleen-Bornemann (1863–1943). 

Soffy Rosenberg made her debut at the Royal Danish Theatre on 9 November 1882 as Antoinette in Pailleron's one-act play Gnisten. After her marriage in 1884, she performed in the private theatres of Copenhagen, especially the Folketeater and, from 1889 to 1894, the Dagmarteater, where she gained a measure of success in Franz Grillparzer's Jødinden fra Toledo. It was however in contemporary works that she was most competent, for example as the seamstress in Emma Gad's Et Sølvbryllup (1890), a role she played repeatedly over the years. She performed equally well as Madam Jensen in Karl Larsen's Kvinder. She went on to play the whimsical Aunt Two in Gustav Wied's Skærmydsler.

She later became a stage director and a talented instructor. In 1910, Soffy Walleen performed in Norsk Film's short silent film Magdelene.

Soffy Walleen died in Copenhagen on 23 January 1940 and was buried in Garrison Cemetery, Copenhagen.

References

External links

 Sophie Kristine Elisabeth Rosenberg at geni.com

1861 births
1940 deaths
People from Faxe Municipality
Burials at the Garrison Cemetery, Copenhagen
19th-century Danish actresses
20th-century Danish actresses
Danish silent film actresses